The 2021 Open Angers Arena Loire was a professional tennis tournament played on indoor hard courts. It was the 1st edition of the tournament and part of the 2021 WTA 125 tournaments season, offering a total of $115,000 in prize money. It took place in Angers, France from 6 to 12 December 2021.

Singles main draw entrants

Seeds 

 1 Rankings as of 29 November 2021.

Other entrants 
The following players received a wildcard into the singles main draw:
  Elsa Jacquemot
  Victoria Jiménez Kasintseva
  Mallaurie Noël
  Jessika Ponchet

The following players received entry from the qualifying draw:
  Isabella Shinikova
  Natalia Vikhlyantseva
  Daniela Vismane
  Yuan Yue

The following players received entry as lucky losers:
  Vitalia Diatchenko
  Martina Di Giuseppe

Withdrawals
Before the tournament
  Mihaela Buzărnescu → replaced by  Mariam Bolkvadze
  Alizé Cornet → replaced by  Tamara Korpatsch
  Jaqueline Cristian → replaced by  Ankita Raina
  Olga Danilović → replaced by  Leonie Küng
  Anhelina Kalinina → replaced by  Vitalia Diatchenko
  Jule Niemeier → replaced by  Ylena In-Albon
  Viktoriya Tomova → replaced by  Anna Blinkova
  Dayana Yastremska → replaced by  Martina Di Giuseppe
  Maryna Zanevska → replaced by  Julia Grabher
  Zheng Qinwen → replaced by  Cristina Bucșa

Doubles entrants

Seeds 

 1 Rankings as of 29 November 2021.

Champions

Singles

  Vitalia Diatchenko def  Zhang Shuai 6–0, 6–4

Doubles

  Tereza Mihalíková /  Greet Minnen def  Monica Niculescu /  Vera Zvonareva 4–6, 6–1, [10–8]

References

External links 
 Official website

2021 WTA 125 tournaments
2021 in French tennis
December 2021 sports events in France